COJ may mean:

Call of Juarez, a Western-themed video game
 City of Jacksonville, specifically referring to the city government's offices
Coonabarabran Airport, a small airport in Australia